NGC 4866 is an unbarred lenticular galaxy located roughly 100 million light-years away in the constellation Virgo. It was first observed by British astronomer Sir William Herschel on January 14, 1787. It is a member of the Virgo Cluster.

On April 1, 2015, a bright source was discovered by the All Sky Automated Survey for SuperNovae (ASAS-SN) program, and was designated ASASSN-15ga. The source is likely a type Ia supernova.

Gallery

References

External links 
 

4866
Lenticular galaxies
Virgo Cluster
Virgo (constellation)
044600